Paul Edward Anderson (October 17, 1932August 15, 1994) was an American weightlifter, strongman, and powerlifter. He was an Olympic gold medalist, a world champion, and a two-time national champion in Olympic weightlifting. Anderson contributed significantly to the development of competitive powerlifting.

Early life
Anderson was born in Toccoa, Georgia, the only son of Ethel Bennett and Robert Anderson. As a teenager, he began his early weight training and training on his own in his family's backyard to increase his size and strength so that he would be able to play on the Toccoa High School football team, where he earned a position as first-team blocking back. He used special homemade weights that his father created out of concrete poured into a wooden form. Anderson attended Furman University on a football scholarship, where he began lifting weights. He later moved to Elizabethton, Tennessee, with his parents, where he met weightlifter Bob Peoples, who would greatly influence him in squat training and introduce him into weightlifting circles.

Career
In 1955, at the height of the Cold War, Anderson, as winner of the USA National Amateur Athletic Union Weightlifting Championship, traveled to the Soviet Union, where weightlifting was a popular sport, for an international weightlifting competition. In a newsreel of the event shown in the United States the narrator, Bud Palmer, commented as follows: "Then, up to the bar stepped a great ball of a man, Paul Anderson." Palmer said, "The Russians snickered as Anderson gripped the bar, which was set at 402.5 pounds, an unheard-of lift. But their snickers quickly changed to awe and all-out cheers as up went the bar and Anderson lifted the heaviest weight overhead of any human in history."
  "We rarely have such weights lifted," said the solemn Russian announcer as Anderson hoisted  in the two-hand press. Prior to Anderson's lift, the Soviet champion, Alexey Medvedev, had matched the Olympic record of the time with a  press. Anderson then did a  press. At a time when Americans were engaged in a symbolic Cold War battle with the Soviet Union, Anderson's strength — and his singular, tank-like appearance — became a rallying cry to all.

During the 1955 World Championships in Munich, Germany, that October, Anderson went on to establish two other world records (for the press [] and total weight cleared []) as he easily won the competition in his weight class to become world champion. Upon his return to the United States, Anderson was received by then Vice-President Richard Nixon, who thanked him for being a goodwill ambassador.

In 1956, Anderson won a gold medal in a long, tough duel with Argentine Humberto Selvetti in the Melbourne, Australia, Olympic Games as a weightlifter in the super-heavyweight class (while suffering from a  fever).

Anderson could not compete in the 1960 Olympics because he had been ruled a professional for accepting money for some of his weightlifting and strength exhibitions. Thus at the 1960 Olympics the Soviet heavyweight Yury Vlasov bested records set at the 1956 Olympics, with Anderson not competing in the contest. A short time later, however, not to be outdone by the Ukrainian as the World's Strongest Man, Anderson lifted the same weight as Vlasov three times in quick succession, demonstrating unbelievable strength. This feat solidified his position as the most dominant lifter in the world and cemented his legacy as the strongest of the strong.

In 1961, Anderson and his wife Glenda founded the Paul Anderson Youth Home, a home for troubled youth, in Vidalia, Georgia. They both helped to build and support the home with an average of 500 speaking engagements and strength exhibitions per year—notwithstanding the congenital chronic kidney disease that eventually killed him at age 61. He would perform stunts such as hammering a nail with his bare fist and raising a table loaded with eight men onto his back.

The Guinness Book of World Records (1985 edition) lists his feat of lifting  in a back lift as "the greatest weight ever raised by a human being". Anderson turned professional after the 1956 Summer Olympics, and thus many of his feats of strength, while generally credible, were not done under rigorous enough conditions to be official. In fact, controversy surrounding the figure in the 1985 Guinness Book led to its withdrawal in subsequent editions; the currently listed Guinness record is 5,340 lbs, set by Gregg Ernst in 1993.

Personal life
In 1950, Anderson married Glenda Garland. The couple were devout Christians. They had one daughter, born 1966.

Death
As a child, Anderson suffered from Bright's disease (now known as chronic nephritis), a kidney disorder, and he eventually died from kidney disease on August 15, 1994, at the age of 61.

Legacy
Anderson's true life testimony can be heard through the Unshackled! radio ministry. It was first broadcast as program number 2521 and later redramatized as program number 3478. Unshackled! has also produced a comic booklet telling Anderson's story.

Paul Anderson Memorial Park, located at the corner of East Tugalo Street and Big A Road in Toccoa, is named for Anderson. The park features a life-size sculpture of him performing an overhead barbell lift. The sculpture was created by Jerry McKenna, renowned American sculptor.

Was once a contestant on “You Bet Your Life” with Groucho Marx.  Paul and his partner answered four questions correctly, winning them $1000.

In July 2019, an episode of the History Channel show The Strongest Man in History featured Paul Anderson's story and several of his historic feats of strength.

Personal records

Official records 
Olympic weightlifting

Done in official competition

 Clean and press:  on 1955-10-16, in Munich at the 1955 World Championships
 Snatch:  on 1956-06-02 in Philadelphia at the 1956 Senior Nationals
 Clean and jerk:  on 1956-06-02 in Philadelphia at the 1956 Senior Nationals
 Total: . Clean and press: . Snatch: . Clean and jerk:  on 1956-06-02 in Philadelphia at the 1956 Senior Nationals

Unofficial lifts 
Powerlifting

Guinness also listed Anderson's best powerlifts

Done in small exhibitions or training (according to Anderson himself)

 Squat:  raw
 Bench press:  raw
 Deadlift:  raw

Olympic weightlifting

Best gym lifts (according to Anderson himself)

 Clean and press: 
 Snatch: 
 Clean and jerk: 

Other lifts

Done in small exhibitions or training

 Best "authenticated" full squat:   as a professional at Silver Spring, Maryland, in 1965
 Full squat: 
 Assisted deadlift (using metal hooks attached to the wrists): 
 Push press:  (off the rack)
 Military press: 
 One-arm side press:

Quotes about Anderson
 Chuck Ahrens (Muscle Beach strongman of the 1950s)
 "I could do 310 in a standing one-arm side press with a dumbbell. Paul could do it for reps with ease."

 Ed Coan (powerlifting record-breaker)
 "Though I never met him personally until the Strength Symposium in Florida, I saw films of him lifting in his heyday, with such absolute ease it was astonishing. Using his strength to benefit others is something that should make all powerlifters proud. What a great benefactor to mankind."

 Jon Cole (powerlifter of the early 1970s)
 "My love and respect for Paul runs deep. His ability to lift enormous weights in limited movements surpasses all. Those who attempt to discredit him shame our sport."

 Bill Kazmaier (3-time World's Strongest Man)
 "He's the king of strength. His backlift was unbelievable. But more amazing was his total commitment as a Christian."

 Don Reinhoudt (one of the strongest powerlifters of all time)
 "Paul was an inspiration to me. Some of his feats may never be surpassed."

 Oliver Sacks (neurologist and Muscle Beach powerlifter)
 "A lot of lifters gathered at Sydney's on Santa Monica Beach near the base of the Pier. Here, as they got pissed [drunk], their stories became more and more fantastic. One heard of deltoids like watermelons and squats of a thousand pounds. This last turned out to be a solid fact for the incredible Paul Anderson. He was squatting with almost twice as much as anyone else's maximum."

Yuri Vlasov (Anderson's major competitor in heavyweight weightlifting)
 "Anderson overcame the limits of human capabilities .. I eagerly absorbed the crumbs of information about his training from the sports magazines. I tried to understand the nature of his amazing power. I did not associate it only with body weight. There should have been something in his training, different from the accepted norms"

 Bruce Wilhelm (2-time World's Strongest Man)
 "Absolutely no question, Paul was the strongest of the strong. His physical deterioration and prolonged illness for the last 16 years of his life was a fate unbefitting such a great strongman and humanitarian. Paul was really a powerlifter and did the overhead lifts only because powerlifting as a sport did not exist 40 years ago. He excelled and was world and Olympic champ because he was far stronger than anyone else. When I hear people talk that a powerlifter will never win an Olympic gold medal, I tell them that Paul Anderson already did it, almost forty years ago."

References

Further reading 
 Anderson, Paul (with Jerry B. Jenkins). The World's Strongest Man. Victor Books, Wheaton, IL. 1975 .
 
 Fair, John D. "Paul Anderson (1932-1994)." New Georgia Encyclopedia. 20 April 2016. Web. 1 June 2016.
 
 Strossen, Randal J. Paul Anderson: The Mightiest Minister. Ironmind Enterprises, Inc., Nevada City, CA 1999 .

External links 
 
 
 
 Paul Anderson at Lift Up Hall of Fame
 The Paul Anderson Youth Home
 Paul Anderson Memorial Park
 Article on Anderson by Clarence Bass
 Article on Anderson at the Univ. of Georgia website
 Unshackled!
 Paul Anderson at Weightlifting Exchange
 You Bet Your Life - The Secret Word Is...Money - Paul Anderson as contestant. Hulu.com. NBC Films. Airdate October 19, 1956
 Dear Paul. Wish you were here / Baldy. "Dear Paul. Wish you were here", 1958, editorial cartoon by Clifford H. Baldowski, Clifford H. Baldowski Editorial Cartoon Collection, Richard B. Russell Library for Political Research and Studies, University of Georgia Libraries, Athens, presented in the Digital Library of Georgia.

1932 births
1994 deaths
People from Toccoa, Georgia
American powerlifters
American strength athletes
American male weightlifters
Weightlifters at the 1956 Summer Olympics
Olympic gold medalists for the United States in weightlifting
Deaths from nephritis
Sportspeople from Georgia (U.S. state)
Olympic medalists in weightlifting
People from Vidalia, Georgia
Medalists at the 1956 Summer Olympics
People from Elizabethton, Tennessee
World Weightlifting Championships medalists